This is a list of cases reported in volume 69 (2 Wall.) of United States Reports, decided by the Supreme Court of the United States in 1864 and 1865.

Nominative reports 
In 1874, the U.S. government created the United States Reports, and retroactively numbered older privately-published case reports as part of the new series.  As a result, cases appearing in volumes 1–90 of U.S. Reports have dual citation forms; one for the volume number of U.S. Reports, and one for the volume number of the reports named for the relevant reporter of decisions (these are called "nominative reports").

John William Wallace 
Starting with the 66th volume of U.S. Reports, the Reporter of Decisions of the Supreme Court of the United States was John William Wallace. Wallace was Reporter of Decisions from 1863 to 1874, covering volumes 68 through 90 of United States Reports which correspond to volumes 1 through 23 of his Wallace's Reports. As such, the dual form of citation to, for example, The Andromeda is 69 U.S. (2 Wall.) 481 (1865).

Wallace's Reports were the final nominative reports for the US Supreme Court; starting with volume 91, cases were identified simply as "(volume #) U.S. (page #) (year)".

Justices of the Supreme Court at the time of 69 U.S. (2 Wall.) 

The Supreme Court is established by Article III, Section 1 of the Constitution of the United States, which says: "The judicial Power of the United States, shall be vested in one supreme Court . . .". The size of the Court is not specified; the Constitution leaves it to Congress to set the number of justices. Under the Judiciary Act of 1789 Congress originally fixed the number of justices at six (one chief justice and five associate justices). Since 1789 Congress has varied the size of the Court from six to seven, nine, ten, and back to nine justices (always including one chief justice).

When the cases in 69 U.S. (2 Wall.) were decided the Court's membership began at ten justices, then shrank to nine upon the death of Chief Justice Taney in October 1864, and increased again to the statutory number of ten when Chief Justice Salmon P. Chase took office in December 1864:

Notable Cases in 69 U.S. (2 Wall.)

The Slavers Cases
The four Slavers Cases ((The Bark Kate), 69 U.S. (2 Wall.) 350 (1865); (The Bark Sarah), 69 U.S. (2 Wall.) 366 (1865); (The Weathergage), 69 U.S. (2 Wall.) 375 (1865); and (The Bark Reindeer), 69 U.S. (2 Wall.) 383 (1865)), involve three ships seized by the federal government near New York City, and one seized off Newport, Rhode Island.  The ships appeared to be set up for the slave trade, and had voyages planned to the western coast of Africa where the slave trade flourished at the time.  The cargo, fittings, and other circumstances surrounding the ships led to a presumption that they were engaged in slaving, contrary to several federal statutes.

In The Bark Kate (at pp. 363–64), Chief Justice Chase wrote in his opinion for the Court:

In considering this evidence, it is to be borne in mind that for more than three hundred years the western coast of Africa has been scourged by the atrocities of the slave trade, and that this inhuman traffic, although at length proscribed and pursued with severe penalties by nearly all Christian nations, has continued, with almost unabated activity and ferocity, even to our times. Fears of forfeiture of property, and even of life, have been easily overcome by hopes of enormous gains, and so long as markets for slaves remain open, and imperfect execution of the laws permits the expectation of profit from crime, the most conspicuous results of penal legislation will be, more cunning in the contrivance and more adroitness in the use of means for evading or defeating its intent and operation. The difficulty of penetrating the disguises of crime is enhanced in the case of the slave trade by the circumstance that a very considerable traffic [in lawful commerce] . . . has sprung up and is carried on with the same African coast from which human cargoes are collected. It does not seem unreasonable, since it is the paramount interest of humanity that the traffic in men be at all events arrested, to require of the trader who engages in a commerce [that] . . . is necessarily suspicious from its theater and circumstances, that he keep his operations so clear and so distinct in their character as to repel the imputation of prohibited purpose.

In each of the four cases the Supreme Court upheld seizure of the ships by the federal government.

Citation style 

Under the Judiciary Act of 1789 the federal court structure at the time comprised District Courts, which had general trial jurisdiction; Circuit Courts, which had mixed trial and appellate (from the US District Courts) jurisdiction; and the United States Supreme Court, which had appellate jurisdiction over the federal District and Circuit courts—and for certain issues over state courts. The Supreme Court also had limited original jurisdiction (i.e., in which cases could be filed directly with the Supreme Court without first having been heard by a lower federal or state court). There were one or more federal District Courts and/or Circuit Courts in each state, territory, or other geographical region.

Bluebook citation style is used for case names, citations, and jurisdictions.  
 e.g.,"C.C.D.N.J." = United States Circuit Court for the District of New Jersey
 e.g.,"D. Mass." = United States District Court for the District of Massachusetts 
 "E." = Eastern; "M." = Middle; "N." = Northern; "S." = Southern; "W." = Western
 e.g.,"C.C.S.D.N.Y." = United States Circuit Court for the Southern District of New York
 e.g.,"M.D. Ala." = United States District Court for the Middle District of Alabama
 "Ct. Cl." = United States Court of Claims
 The abbreviation of a state's name alone indicates the highest appellate court in that state's judiciary at the time. 
 e.g.,"Pa." = Supreme Court of Pennsylvania
 e.g.,"Me." = Supreme Judicial Court of Maine

List of cases in 69 U.S. (2 Wall.)

Notes and references

See also
certificate of division

External links
  Case reports in volume 69 (2 Wall.) from Library of Congress
  Case reports in volume 69 (2 Wall.) from Court Listener
  Case reports in volume 69 (2 Wall.) from the Caselaw Access Project of Harvard Law School
  Case reports in volume 69 (2 Wall.) from Google Scholar
  Case reports in volume 69 (2 Wall.) from Justia
  Case reports in volume 69 (2 Wall.) from Open Jurist
 Website of the United States Supreme Court
 United States Courts website about the Supreme Court
 National Archives, Records of the Supreme Court of the United States
 American Bar Association, How Does the Supreme Court Work?
 The Supreme Court Historical Society

1864 in United States case law
1865 in United States case law